Richard James Miano (born September 3, 1962) is a former American football defensive back who played 10 seasons for three teams in the National Football League (NFL). He has served as executive director of the Hula Bowl, a college football all-star game, since it was revived in 2020.

Biography
Miano was a walk-on for the Hawaii Rainbow Warriors college football team in 1981, and became an all-Western Athletic Conference defensive back in 1983 and 1984. Miano was selected in the sixth round of the 1985 NFL Draft by the New York Jets, where he played five seasons.  After missing the entire 1990 season with a knee injury, Miano went to the Philadelphia Eagles where he played four seasons. In 1995, his final season in the NFL, he played for the Atlanta Falcons.

After his retirement from the NFL, Miano moved back to his home in Honolulu, Hawaii, where he became an associate coach with the Hawaii Rainbow Warriors. After head coach Greg McMackin resigned from Hawaii in 2011, Miano became head coach for the Henry J. Kaiser High School team. There, Miano's team won an HHSAA championship in 2013 with a 12–1 record.

In July 2014, Miano was hired as a color analyst for Hawaii football games broadcast on OC Sports. 

Miano and his wife, Lori, have two children.

Head coaching record
Miano accrued a 20–4 record in two seasons as head coach of the Kaiser Cougars, including leading them to a state championship in 2013, when the team defeated Kauai in the D-II final, 17–7.

References

External links
 Hawaii profile

1962 births
Living people
American football safeties
Atlanta Falcons players
Hawaii Rainbow Warriors football coaches
High school football coaches in Hawaii
Hawaii Rainbow Warriors football players
New York Jets players
Philadelphia Eagles players
Sportspeople from Newton, Massachusetts